The 2007 Badminton Asia Championships is the 26th tournament of the Badminton Asia Championships. It was held in Johor Bahru, Malaysia from April 10 to April 15, 2007 with the total prize money of US$125,000.

Venue
Stadium Bandaraya Johor Bahru

Medalists

Medal count

Final Results

Men's singles

Women's singles

Men's doubles

Women's doubles

Mixed doubles

References

External links
Official website

Badminton Asia Championships
Asian Badminton Championships
B
Asian Badminton Championships
2007 in Malaysian sport
Sport in Johor